Lessemsauridae is a clade of early sauropodiform dinosaurs that lived in the Triassic and Jurassic of Argentina, South Africa and possibly Lesotho. A phylogenetic analysis performed by Apaldetti and colleagues in 2018 recovered a new clade of sauropodiforms uniting Lessemsaurus, Antetonitrus, and Ingentia which they named Lessemsauridae. It is a node-based taxon, defined as all descendants of the most recent common ancestor of Lessemsaurus sauropoides and Antetonitrus ingenipes. Depending on the definition of Sauropoda, Lessemsauridae is either one of the most basal sauropod taxa, or a sister taxon of Sauropoda. An additional member of the clade was named later in 2018, Ledumahadi. A 2021 study by Pol and colleagues also assigned the genera Kholumolumo and Meroktenos to the group.

Lessemsaurids are recognised as very large quadrupeds that achieved giant sizes (up to 12 metric tons) independently of other giant sauropodomorphs. They had highly pneumatic cervical and dorsal vertebrae, very antero-posteriorly short but tall cervical vertebrae, robust cervicals, a very expanded distal scapula blade, and upright arms.

References

Sauropodomorphs
Norian first appearances
Early Jurassic extinctions
Tetrapod unranked clades